Bogdan Gajda (born 26 August 1953) is a Polish boxer. He competed at the 1976 Summer Olympics and the 1980 Summer Olympics. At the 1976 Summer Olympics, he lost to Vassily Solomin of the Soviet Union. At the 1980 Summer Olympics, he lost to Shadrach Odhiambo of Sweden.

References

External links
 

1953 births
Living people
Polish male boxers
Olympic boxers of Poland
Boxers at the 1976 Summer Olympics
Boxers at the 1980 Summer Olympics
People from Płońsk County
Light-welterweight boxers
Middleweight boxers
21st-century Polish people
20th-century Polish people